Colum Hourihane is an Irish-born professor at Princeton University specializing in Medieval art, where he is a former director of Christian Art. He studied archeology at University College Cork and the National University of Ireland Galway (1977) before attaining a PhD at the Courtauld Institute of Art in 1984, after which he studied iconography in Gothic Irish art.

Hourihan has published widely and is a member of the Royal Irish Academy and fellow of the Society of Antiquaries of London. In 2012 he edited an edition of the "Grove Encyclopedia of Medieval Art and Architecture" for Oxford University Press. Between 2008 and 2011 he was president of the International Center of Medieval Art.

Selected publications

Books
 Patronage: Power and Agency in Medieval Art (ed.). Penn State University Press, 2013. 
 Pontius Pilate, Anti-Semitism, and the Passion in Medieval Art. Princeton University Press, 2009. 
 Gothic Art in Ireland 1169-1550: Enduring Vitality . Yale University Press, 2003. 
 Virtue and Vice: The Personifications in the Index of Christian Art, Art and Archaeology, Princeton University, 2000. 
 From Ireland Coming: Irish Art from the Early Christian to the Late Gothic Periods and its Context within Europe (ed.). Yale University Press, 1984

Journals
 "Insights and Interpretations: Studies in Celebration of the Eighty-fifth Anniversary of the Index of Christian Art". ''Comitatus: A Journal of Medieval and Renaissance Studies", Volume 34, 2003

References

Alumni of University College Cork
Irish archaeologists
Irish art historians
Living people
Year of birth missing (living people)